Margold is a surname. Notable people with the surname include:

Nathan Ross Margold (1899–1947), Romanian-born American lawyer
William Margold (1943–2017), American pornographic film actor and porn film director

See also

Mangold